Dryophylax phoenix  is a species of snake in the family Colubridae. The species is endemic to Brazil.

References

Dryophylax
Snakes of South America
Reptiles of Brazil
Endemic fauna of Brazil
Reptiles described in 2017